Ellen Andrée (born Hélène Marie André; 7 March 1856  – 9 December 1933) was a French model for Édouard Manet, Edgar Degas and Pierre-Auguste Renoir and other impressionists, in the 1870s.

Life
Andrée was born in 1856 in Paris and lived in the Rue du Rocher. She started working as a model, and has become notable because she appeared in a number of important impressionist paintings. She became an actress in the Naturalist style of theatre, in which the purpose was to give a near perfect view of real scenes and not to rely on the audience's imagination. She worked in that profession for several decades, appearing in plays and comedies such as those by Sacha Guitry and Georges Courteline, but it was the brief period in the 1870s, when she was a model for a number of artists, most importantly Édouard Manet, Edgar Degas and Pierre-Auguste Renoir, that made her name.  In 1878 she was the model for Rolla, a painting by Henri Gervex, that was based on a poem by Alfred de Musset.

Andree was a collector herself of images and autographs.

Bibliography 
 Jean Sutherland Boggs: Degas. Ausstellungskatalog Paris, Ottawa, New York, Réunion des musées nationaux, Paris 1988, .
 Françoise Cachin: Manet. DuMont, Köln 1991 
 John Collins: Ellen Andrée in Berk Jiminez: Dictionary of Artists' Models. Fitzroy Dearborn, Chicago 2001, .
 Bernard Denvir: The chronicle of Impressionism. Thames and Hudson, London 1993, .
 Benoît Noël, Jean Hournon: Parisiana : la capitale des peintres au XIXe siècle. Presses Franciliennes, Paris 2006, .
 Theodore Reff: Manet and modern Paris. National Gallery of Art, Washington und University of Chicago Press, Chicago und London 1982, .
 Maryanne Stevens, Colin B. Bailey, Stephane Guegan: Manet, portraying life, Ausstellungskatalog Toledo Museum of Art und Royal Academy of Arts 2012–13, Royal Academy of Arts, London 2012, . 
 Terry W. Strieter: Nineteenth-century European art. Aldwych Press, London 1999, .
 Adolphe Tabarant: Manet et ses oeuvres. Gallimard, Paris 1947.

References

External links 

 Verzeichnis der Bühnenrollen mit Ellen Andrée (Auswahl)
 Rolla

1857 births
1925 deaths
Actresses from Paris
French stage actresses
19th-century French actresses
French artists' models